Cyperus thunbergii is a species of sedge that is native to South Africa.

The species was first formally described by the botanist Martin Vahl in 1805.

See also 
 List of Cyperus species

References 

thunbergii
Taxa named by Martin Vahl
Plants described in 1805
Flora of South Africa